Ali bin Abdullah Al Kaabi is the former minister of labour and social affairs in the United Arab Emirates. He was appointed in 2004 on the same day of the president Shiekh Zayed's death.

Education
Alkaabi was educated at The George Washington University in Washington DC. He obtained a PhD in engineering management.

Career
Alkaabi worked for a short time at the UAE Military Office as a computer network administrator and then at the UAE scholarship office in Washington DC.

References

Living people
George Washington University School of Engineering and Applied Science alumni
Government ministers of the United Arab Emirates
Year of birth missing (living people)
Place of birth missing (living people)